Snakebite Township is an inactive township in Bertie County, in the U.S. state of North Carolina.

History
Snakebite Township was so-named when a state guardsman bit off the head of a snake in order to win a bet.

References

Former municipalities in North Carolina
Bertie County, North Carolina